The Communauté de communes du Canton de Fauquembergues is a former intercommunality in the Pas-de-Calais département, in northern France. It was created in January 1994. It was merged into the Communauté d'agglomération du Pays de Saint-Omer in January 2017.

Composition
It comprised the following 18 communes:

Audincthun
Avroult
Beaumetz-lès-Aire
Bomy
Coyecques
Dennebrœucq
Enguinegatte
Enquin-les-Mines
Erny-Saint-Julien
Fauquembergues
Febvin-Palfart
Fléchin
Laires
Merck-Saint-Liévin
Reclinghem
Renty
Saint-Martin-d'Hardinghem
Thiembronne

References 

Fauquembergues